Lemma Barkeloo (1840–1870, aka Lemma Barkaloo) was one of the first women in America to attend law school, alongside Phoebe Couzins. She was the first woman admitted to the Missouri bar and the first woman to try a case in an American court.

She was born on March 26, 1840 to Teunis Suydam Barkeloo and Lammetje G. Barkeloo (nee Bergen). Her uncle was Teunis G. Bergen, a Congressman from New York. Barkeloo lived in Brooklyn, New York and graduated with honors from Moravian College in Bethlehem, Pennsylvania.

She began attending Washington University School of Law in 1869. However, she never finished her course work or graduated. Prior to completing her first year, she petitioned to take the Missouri bar without her law degree. On March 25, 1870, she passed the bar exam. The next day, she was the first woman admitted to the Missouri bar. She began to practice law in the offices of Lucien Eaton and became the first woman to try a case in an American court.

Only a couple months after she was admitted to the bar, she died from typhoid fever on September 11, 1870.

In 2000 Susan Frelich Appleton, J.D., was installed as the inaugural Lemma Barkeloo and Phoebe Couzins Professor of Law at the Washington University School of Law.

See also
List of first women lawyers and judges in Missouri

References

1840 births
1870 deaths
Washington University School of Law alumni
Deaths from typhoid fever
19th-century American women lawyers
19th-century American lawyers
Infectious disease deaths in Missouri
Moravian University alumni